1,1,2-Trichloro-1,2,2-trifluoroethane, also called trichlorotrifluoroethane or CFC-113, is a chlorofluorocarbon. It has the formula . This colorless, volatile liquid is a versatile solvent.

Atmospheric reactions

CFC-113 is a very unreactive chlorofluorocarbon. It remains in the atmosphere about 90 years, sufficiently long that it will cycle out of the troposphere and into the stratosphere. In the stratosphere, CFC-113 can be broken up by ultraviolet radiation (where sunlight in the 190-225 nm (UV) range), generating chlorine radicals (Cl•), which initiate degradation of ozone requiring only a few minutes:

This reaction is followed by:

The process regenerates Cl• to destroy more . The Cl• will destroy an average of 100,000  molecules during its atmospheric lifetime of 1–2 years. In some parts of the world, these reactions have significantly thinned the Earth's natural stratospheric ozone layer that shields the biosphere against solar UV radiation; increased UV levels at the surface can cause skin cancer or even blindness.

Uses
CFC-113 was one of the most heavily produced CFCs. In 1989, an estimated 250,000 tons were produced. It has been used as a cleaning agent for electrical and electronic components. CFC-113 is one of the three most popular CFCs, along with CFC-11 and CFC-12.

CFC-113’s low flammability and low toxicity made it ideal for use as a cleaner for delicate electrical equipment, fabrics, and metals. It would not harm the product it was cleaning, ignite with a spark or react with other chemicals.

CFC-113 in laboratory analytics has been replaced by other solvents.

Reduction of CFC-113 with zinc gives chlorotrifluoroethylene:

Dangers
Aside from its immense environmental impacts, Freon 113, like most chlorofluoroalkanes, forms phosgene gas when exposed to a naked flame.

See also
1,1,1-Trichloro-2,2,2-trifluoroethane

References

Organofluorides
Chlorofluorocarbons
Greenhouse gases